This is a chronological list of French engravers.

Renaissance

 Geoffroy Tory (1480–1533), humanist and engraver
 Jean Rabel (1545–1603), painter and engraver
 Jean Duvet (c. 1485–c. 1570), engraver
 Jean Cousin the Younger (1490–1561), painter, engraver, sculptor
 Thomas de Leu (1560–1612), engraver
 Jacques Bellange (1575–1616), engraver
 Daniel Rabel (1578–1637), painter and engraver

17th-century 
 François Perrier (1590–1650), painter and engraver
 Jacques Callot (1592–1635), engraver
 Claude Mellan (1598–1688), painter, draughtsman and engraver
 Balthasar Moncornet (1600–1668), painter and engraver
 Abraham Bosse (1602–1676), engraver
 Jean Varin (1604–1672), sculptor, engraver, medallist
 Nicolas Robert (1610–1684), miniaturist and engraver
 François Chauveau (1613–1676), draughtsman, engraver and painter
 Michel Dorigny (1617–1663), painter and engraver
 Jean Le Pautre (1618–1682), draughtsman and engraver
 Jean Marot (1619–1679), draughtsman and engraver
 Albert Flamen (1620–1674), engraver
 Israël Silvestre (1621–1691), engraver
 Robert Nanteuil (1623–1678), engraver, draughtsman and pastelist
 François de Poilly (1623-1693), engraver
 Gabriel Perelle (1604–1677), engraver
 Gérard Audran (1640–1703), engraver
 Jean Mauger (1648–1712), medallist and engraver on copperplate
 Gérard Edelinck (1649–1707), engraver
 Jacques Restout (1650–1701), painter
 Louis Dorigny (1654–1742), painter and engraver
 Eustache Restout (1655–1743), architect, engraver and painter

18th-century
 Nicolas Dorigny (1658–1746), painter and engraver
 Pierre Drevet (1664–1738), engraver
 Étienne Jehandier Desrochers (1668–1741), engraver
 François Chéreau (1680-1729), engraver
 Charles Dupuis (1685–1742), engraver
 Jean-Baptiste Oudry (1686–1755), painter and engraver
 Jacques Chéreau (1688–1776), engraver and publisher
 Anne Claude Philippe de Tubieres de Grimoard de Pestels de Levis, Comte de Caylus (1692–1765)
 Pierre-Jean Mariette (1694–1774), bookseller and engraver
 Nicolas-Gabriel Dupuis (1695–1771), engraver
 Pierre Imbert Drevet (1697–1739), engraver
 Hubert-Francois Bourguignon Gravelot (1699–1773), engraver
 Jacques-François Blondel (1705–1774), architect and engraver
 François Boucher (1703–1770), painter, engraver
 Jacques-Philippe Le Bas (1707–1783), engraver
 Noël Hallé (1711–1781), painter and engraver
 Pierre-Simon Fournier (1712–1768), engraver
 Jean-Baptiste Marie Pierre (1714–1789), painter, engraver, draughtsman
 Jean-Joseph Balechou (1715–1765), engraver
 Jacques Guay (1715–1787), engraver
 Charles-Nicolas Cochin (1715–1790), engraver and draughtsman
 Joseph-Marie Vien (1716–1809), painter, draughtsman and engraver
 Carmontelle (1717–1806), painter, draughtsman, engraver
 Claude-Henri Watelet (1718–1786) 
 Étienne Ficquet (1719–1794), engraver
 Charles Eisen (1720–1778), painter and engraver
 Charles Germain de Saint Aubin (1721–1786), engraver
 Pierre-François Basan (1723–1797), engraver
 Jacques Aliamet (1726–1788), engraver
 Jacques Firmin Beauvarlet (1731–1797), engraver
 Hubert Robert (1733–1808), painter, engraver
 Benoît-Louis Prévost (1735 or 1747–1804), engraver
 Jean-Pierre Houël (1735–1813), engraver, draughtsman and painter
 Simon Charles Miger (1736–1828), engraver
 Jean-Jacques de Boissieu (1736–1810), engraver
 Pierre-François Laurent (1739-1809), engraver
 Jean-Michel Moreau (1741–1814), engraver
 François-Rolland Elluin (1745–1810), engraver
 Gérard van Spaendonck (1746–1822), painter and engraver
 Vivant Denon (1747–1825), diplomat and administrator, writer and engraver
 Augustin Dupré (1748–1833), medallist and engraver
 Charles Eschard (1748–1810), painter, draughtsman and engraver
 P. Jean-Baptiste Bradel (c. 1750–?), draughtsman and engraver
 Michel-François Dandré-Bardon (1752–1809), painter, draughtsman and engraver
 Philibert-Louis Debucourt (1755–1832), painter and engraver
 Charles Clément Balvay (1756–1822), engraver
 François-Nicolas Martinet (c. 1760–1800), engineer and engraver

19th-century (Romanticism and Impressionism) 

 Jean Achard (1807–1884), painter and engraver
 Théodore Basset de Jolimont (1787-1854)
 Louis Léopold Boilly (1761–1845), painter, draughtsman and engraver
 Louis Albert Guislain Bacler d'Albe (1761–1824), painter, engraver
 Louis-Pierre Baltard (1764–1846), architect, engraver and painter
 Pierre Audouin (1768–1822), engraver
 Louis-François Lejeune (1775–1848), painter and engraver
 Pierre Bouillon (1776–1831), engraver and painter
 Eustache-Hyacinthe Langlois (1777–1837), painter, draughtsman and engraver
 Auguste Gaspard Louis Desnoyers (1779–1857), engraver
 Henri Laurent (1779-1844), engraver
 Théodore Richomme (1785–1849), engraver
 Auguste-François Michaut (1785–1849), engraver, medallist, sculptor
 François Forster (1790–1872), engraver
 Nicolas-Toussaint Charlet (1792–1845), painter and engraver
 Léon Cogniet (1794–1880), painter, portraitist and lithographer
 Louis-Henri Brévière (1797–1869), engraver
 Louis-Pierre Henriquel-Dupont (1797–1892), engraver and draughtsman
 Charles Philipon (1800–1862), draughtsman, lithographer, journalist and editor
 Achille Devéria (1800–1857), painter, engraver
 Bernard-Romain Julien (1802–1871), lithographer
 Tony Johannot (1803–1852), engraver, illustrator and painter
 Jean Ignace Isidore Gérard (Grandville), (1803–1847), engraver
 Auguste Raffet (1804–1860), draughtsman and engraver
 Eugène Isabey (1804–1886), painter, watercolorist and lithographer
 Espérance Langlois (1805–1864), painter and engraver
 Louis Godefroy Jadin (1805–1882), animal and landscape painter
 Honoré Daumier (1808–1879), painter, engraver
 Karl Bodmer (1809–1893), lithographer, draughtsman, illustrator and painter
 Polyclès Langlois (1813–1872), engraver, draughtsman and painter
 Charles Blanc (1813–1882), historian, art critic and engraver
 Charles Jacque (1813–1894), animal painter and engraver
 Charles Marville (1816–1879), painter, engraver, photographer
 Alphonse Leroy (1820–1902), engraver
 Charles Meryon (1821–1868), engraver
 Hector Giacomelli (1822–1904), painter, watercolorist, illustrator and engraver
 François Chifflart (1825–1901), painter and draughtsman
 Pierre-Auguste Lamy (1827–1880), engraver, lithographer and watercolorist
 Léopold Flameng (1831–1911), engraver, illustrator and painter
 Gustave Doré (1832–1883), engraver
 Edgar Degas (1834–1917), painter, engraver, sculptor and photographer
 James Tissot (1836–1902), painter and etcher
 Henri Fantin-Latour (1836–1904), painter and lithographer
 Jules Chéret (1836–1932), painter, poster artist and lithographer
 Alphonse Legros (1837–1911), painter and engraver
 Adolphe Lalauze (1838–1905), illustrator, painter and engraver
 Jules-Clément Chaplain (1839–1909), engraver
 Odilon Redon (1840–1916), painter, engraver and pastelist
 Fortuné Méaulle (1844–1901), wood-engraver and writer
 Alfred Johannot (1800–1836), engraver and painter

19th-century (Impression and Fauvism)

 Henri Thiriat (1843–1926), engraver 
 Léon Barillot (1844–1929), engraver and painter
 Victor Gustave Lhuillier (1844–1889),  engraver and etcher
 Eugène Grasset (1845–1917), engraver, poster artist and decorator
 Pierre Georges Jeanniot (1848–1934), painter, draughtsman, watercolorist, and engraver
 Eugène Carrière (1849–1906), painter and lithographer
 Auguste-Louis Lepère (1849–1918), painter and engraver
 Jean-Louis Forain (1852–1931), painter, illustrator and engraver
 Adolphe Willette (1857–1926), illustrator, caricaturist and engraver
 Théophile Alexandre Steinlen (1859–1923), painter, draughtsman and lithographer
 George Auriol (1863–1938), journalist, poet, painter and engraver
 Henri Bellery-Desfontaines (1867–1909), painter, illustrator, poster artist, lithographer, draughtsman, architect and engraver
 Edgar Chahine (1874–1947), painter, illustrator and engraver
 Charles Dufresne (1876–1938), painter, engraver and decorator

20th-century (before World War II)
 
 Abel Mignon (1861–1936), engraver
 Allan Österlind (1855–1938), painter and engraver
 Malo-Renault (1870–1938) illustrator, color engraver and pastelist 
 Jacques Villon (1875–1963), painter and engraver
 Adolphe Beaufrère (1876–1960), painter and engraver
 Raoul Dufy (1877–1953), painter, draughtsman, illustrator, ceramist, decorator and engraver
 Henry Cheffer (1880–1957), painter and engraver
 Raoul Serres (1881–1971), illustrator and engraver
 Marie Laurencin (1883–1956), painter and engraver
 Jean Metzinger (1883–1956), painter, engraver

20th-century (post-World War II)
 Henri-Georges Adam (1904–1967), engraver and sculptor
 Pierre Albuisson (1952–), draughtsman and engraver
 Hans Bellmer (1902–1975), sculptor, photographer, engraver
 Jean Bertholle (1909–1996), painter
 Johnny Friedlaender (1912–1992), painter and engraver
 Henri Goetz (1909–1989), painter and engraver
 Cécile Guillame (1933–2004), engraver
 Max Leognany (1913–1994), painter, engraver, sculptor
 Ève Luquet (1954–), designer and engraver
 Jeanne Malivel (1895–1926), decorator and engraver
 Alfred Manessier (1911–1993), painter
 Gen Paul (1898–1975), painter, engraver
 René Quillivic (1925–), sculptor and engraver
 Alfred-Georges Regner (1902–1987), painter and engraver
 Pierre-Yves Trémois (1921–), painter, engraver and sculptor
 Raoul Ubac (1910–1985), painter
 Zao Wou-Ki (1921–2013), photographer, calligrapher, sculptor, engraver

See also 
 :Category:French engravers
 List of French painters
 List of French artists

References

 
 Engravers
French engravers
Engravers